Steve Silverman may refer to:

 Steven Silverman (born 1954), lawyer, Director of the Montgomery County, MD Department of Economic Development, 2009-2014
 Stephen M. Silverman (born 1951), entertainment journalist and nonfiction writer